Majid Jahandideh (born 7 August 1968) is an Iranian wrestler. He competed in the men's Greco-Roman 52 kg at the 1992 Summer Olympics.

References

1968 births
Living people
Iranian male sport wrestlers
Olympic wrestlers of Iran
Wrestlers at the 1992 Summer Olympics
Sportspeople from Tehran